Filial responsibility laws (filial support laws, filial piety laws) are laws in the United States that impose a duty, usually upon adult children, for the support of their impoverished parents or other relatives. In some cases the duty is extended to other relatives. Such laws may be enforced by governmental or private entities and may be at the state or national level.  While most filial responsibility laws contemplate civil enforcement, some include criminal penalties for adult children or close relatives who fail to provide for family members when challenged to do so. The key concept is impoverished, as there is no requirement that the parent be aged.  For non-Western societies, the term "filial piety" has been applied to family responsibilities toward elders.
  
A “filial responsibility law” is not the same thing as the provision in United States federal law which requires a “lookback” of five years in the financial records of anyone applying for Medicaid to ensure that the person did not give away assets in order to qualify for Medicaid.

Similar laws also exist in Germany, France, Taiwan and Singapore.

History
Filial support laws were an outgrowth of the Elizabethan Poor Law of 1601.

At one time, as many as 45 U.S. states had statutes obligating an adult child to care for his or her parents. Some states repealed their filial support laws after Medicaid took a greater role in providing relief to elderly patients without means. Other states did not, and a large number of filial support laws remain dormant on the books.
  
Generally, the media has not covered filial responsibility laws much, and there has not been the political will to see that they are enforced.  As of 2019, twenty-six states plus Puerto Rico have such laws on the books, and a few states require the potential support of grandparents or even siblings.

Support required
Typically, these laws obligate adult children (or depending on the state, other family members) to pay for their indigent parents’/relatives' food, clothing, shelter and medical needs. Should the children fail to provide adequately, they allow nursing homes and government agencies to bring legal action to recover the cost of caring for the parents.  Adult children can even go to jail in some states if they fail to provide filial support.

States and territories with filial responsibility laws

Note: Iowa was still included in the list as of 2019, but repealed its filial responsibility law in 2015.

Trial case
In 2012, the media reported the case of John Pittas, whose mother had received care in a skilled nursing facility in Pennsylvania after an accident and then moved to Greece. The nursing home sued her son directly, before even trying to collect from Medicaid. A court in Pennsylvania ruled that the son must pay, according to the Pennsylvania filial responsibility law.

Similar laws in other jurisdictions

Canada 
Every Canadian province except for Alberta and British Columbia has filial support laws on the books, although these laws are very rarely enforced. Unlike the United States where filial responsibility laws were based on English poor laws, filial responsibility laws were enacted by the Canadian provinces in response to the harsh economic conditions of the Great Depression. Despite the official passage of these laws, very few parents sought the enforcement of these laws by the courts, with one study finding only 58 reported cases in the years between 1933 and 1963.

In the 1980s and 1990s, most provinces included the old filial responsibility laws in their reformed family laws.

Alberta dropped their filial responsibility law in 2005 and British Columbia repealed theirs in 2011.

Europe
In Germany, people who are related in a "direct line" (grandparents, parents, children, grandchildren) are required to support each other, this includes children with impoverished parents (:de:Elternunterhalt, support to parents).

In France, close relatives (such as children, parents and spouses) are required to support each other in case of need (:fr:obligation alimentaire, duty to support'').

Asia

Singapore, Taiwan, India, and Mainland China criminalize refusal of financial or emotional support for one's elderly parents.

See also
 Filiation
 Aliment, in Scotland
 Legitimacy (family law)
 Legitime

Notes

Further reading
 
 
 
 
 

Family law
Filial piety
Elder law